Valhalla Vineyards is a vineyard and winery located in Roanoke County, Virginia, founded by James and Debra Vascik in 1994.

History
The Vasciks paid $1.2 million for the  property in 1993. Construction on the winery building and  wine cave began in 1996.

The winery's first vintage was in 1998 and released in 2000. Valhalla was one of two Virginia vineyards to process its grapes underground in 1998. The vineyard uses a "gravity flow" system in which grapes are pressed through holes in the roof of the winery, which is set into the hillside.  The goal of this pump-free process is to prevent damage to the grapes.

Valhalla Vineyards has primarily received attention for their red wines, such as the Götterdämmerung Cabernet Franc/Merlot blend. Their 1999 Syrah was praised by Wine Spectator as being the best of its class from Virginia and the US South.

References

External links
 Valhalla Vineyards official website
 Valhalla Vineyards at Appellation America

Roanoke County, Virginia
Wineries in Virginia
1994 establishments in Virginia